Asymphyla is a genus of moths belonging to the family Tineidae. The genus was erected by László Anthony Gozmány and Lajos Vári in 1973.

References

Tineinae